New Hope Baptist Church  is a church in Newark, New Jersey, located at 106 Sussex Avenue in University Heights.

History
New Hope began its services as a "mission" in the home of Addie and Maggie Vine. The church organized on June 2, 1903, by the small but growing African-American community in Newark and incorporated on May 1, 1918.

Famous members of the congregation include late pop/R&B singer Whitney Houston, who grew up attending the church and singing in the choir, as well as her cousins Dionne and Dee Dee Warwick. Whitney's mother Cissy Houston is also a lifelong active member of the congregation, and serves on the Deaconess Board.

Events
In 2010, Cory Booker kicked off his Newark mayoral re-election bid at the church.
Cissy Houston has long been a musical influence on the church. Funeral services for Whitney Houston, a lifelong member of the congregation, were held at the New Hope Baptist Church.

NJ Governor Chris Christie began his inauguration activities at the church in 2009 and 2014.

See also
 The Drinkard Singers
 McDonald's Gospelfest

References

External links 
 New Hope Newark

Baptist churches in New Jersey
Churches in Newark, New Jersey
African-American history in Newark, New Jersey
Culture of Newark, New Jersey